Germanus III (? – 1289) was Ecumenical Patriarch of Constantinople (May 25, 1265 – September 14, 1266). He attended the Second Council of Lyon in 1272 as the representative of Michael VIII Palaiologos.

References

Bibliography 
 

1289 deaths
13th-century patriarchs of Constantinople
Michael VIII Palaiologos